Konstantin Alekseevich Satunin (20 May 1863–10 November 1915) was a Russian zoologist who studied and described many mammals found in Russia and Central Asia.

Satunin graduated from Moscow University in 1890. From 1893 he worked at a sericulture station in the Caucasus. He became a senior specialist at the Department of Agriculture in 1907, concentrating on applied zoology and hunting in the Caucasus. He continued in this post until his death in 1915. He principally studied the mammals of Russia and Central Asia, and was responsible for describing many new species. He published many works on the fauna of the Caucasus, mainly in the field of mammalogy but also entomology, herpetology, ichthyology, ornithology, sericulture, zoogeography, game management science and fishing. For example, he gave descriptions of a tiger from Prishibinskoye, comparing it to a horse.

See also
 Vratislav Mazák

References

Further reading 
 Kozhevnikov, G. K. A. Satunin. Ornitologicheskii vestnik, 1916, no. 1.
 Konstantin Alekseevich Satunin (1863–1915). In B. N. Mazurmovich, Vydaiushchiesia otechestvennye zoologi [The prominent Russian zoologists]. Moscow, 1960.
 Satunin, K. A. 1914. Opredelitel’ mlekopitayushchikh Rossiiskoi Imperii [Guide to the mammals of Imperial Russia]. Tiflis, 1:1-410.
 Satunin, K. A. Mlekopitaiushchie Kavkazskogo kraia, vols. 1–2. Tiflis, 1915–20.

1863 births
1915 deaths
People from Yaroslavl